The Mussenden Temple and Downhill Demesne is a National Trust property consisting of Downhill Castle and its estate, which includes the Mussenden Temple.

See also 
 Hezlett House

References 
 
 
 

National Trust properties in Northern Ireland
Tourist attractions in County Londonderry